Places of Mind: A Life of Edward Said is a 2021 book by Timothy Brennan that examines the life of Edward Said. The book has six "positive" reviews, eight "rave" reviews, three "mixed" reviews, and one "pan" review, according to review aggregator Book Marks.

The book has been reviewed in Bookforum, The New Yorker, and in ''The New York Times Book Review.

References

2021 non-fiction books
English-language books
Farrar, Straus and Giroux books
Edward Said